Glentui is a small rural community in the Waimakariri District, New Zealand. It is well known for Glentui Meadows, a facility frequently used by youth groups and schools for camping.

Close to Gentui was Birch Hill Station, a sheep station that was taken up by Theophilus Samuel Mannering in the nineteenth century. George Edward Mannering, who would later become an mountaineer, was born here in 1862.

Demographics
Glentui is part of the wider Okuku statistical area.

Climate
The average temperature in summer is 16.2 °C, and in winter is 5.9 °C.

References

Waimakariri District
Populated places in Canterbury, New Zealand